Arkady Topayev (born 1 August 1971) is a Kazakhstani boxer. He competed in the men's light middleweight event at the 1992 Summer Olympics.

References

External links
 

1971 births
Living people
Kazakhstani male boxers
Olympic boxers of the Unified Team
Boxers at the 1992 Summer Olympics
Asian Games medalists in boxing
Boxers at the 1994 Asian Games
Asian Games silver medalists for Kazakhstan
Medalists at the 1994 Asian Games
Light-middleweight boxers
20th-century Kazakhstani people